, English title: Princess Tsuki, is a 1958 color Japanese film directed by Minoru Watanabe.

Cast
 Raizo Ichikawa

References

External links
  http://www.raizofan.net/link4/movie2/keizu.htm

1958 films
Daiei Film films
1950s Japanese films